The 2013–14 Football League Two (referred to as Sky Bet League Two for sponsorship reasons) is the tenth season of the league under its current title and nineteenth season under its current league division format. The season began on 3 August 2013 and finished on 3 May 2014 with all matches that day kicking off simultaneously.

Of the 24 teams which will participate, eighteen of these remain following the 2012–13 Football League Two. They will be joined by four teams from 2012–13 Football League One, and two teams from the 2012–13 Football Conference.

Changes from last season

Team changes
The following teams changed division at the end of the 2012–13 season.

To League Two
Promoted from Conference National
 Mansfield Town
 Newport County

Relegated from League One
 Bury
 Hartlepool United
 Portsmouth
 Scunthorpe United

From League Two
Relegated to Conference National
 Barnet
 Aldershot Town

Promoted to League One
 Gillingham
 Rotherham United
 Port Vale
 Bradford City

Team overview

Stadia and locations

Personnel and sponsoring

Managerial changes

League table

Play-offs

Results

Season statistics

Top scorers

Scoring
First goal of the season: Mark Roberts for Fleetwood Town against Dagenham & Redbridge (3 August 2013)
Fastest goal of the season: 17 seconds, Jordan Chapell for Torquay United against Portsmouth (26 October 2013)
Largest winning margin: 5 goals
Plymouth Argyle 5–0 Morecambe (1 March 2014)
Highest scoring game: 9 goals
 Fleetwood Town 5–4 Mansfield Town (23 November 2013)
Most goals scored in a match by a single team: 5 goals
 Fleetwood Town 5–4 Mansfield Town (23 November 2013)
 Plymouth Argyle 5–0 Morecambe (1 March 2014)
 Accrington Stanley 5–1 Morecambe (14 March 2014)
Most goals scored in a match by a losing team: 4 goals
Fleetwood Town 5–4 Mansfield Town (23 November 2013)

Notes

References

External links 
 

 
EFL League Two seasons
3
4
Eng